Enaphalodes is a genus of beetles in the family Cerambycidae, containing the following species:

 Enaphalodes archboldi Lingafelter & Chemsak, 2002
 Enaphalodes atomarius (Drury, 1773)
 Enaphalodes boyacanus Martins, 2005
 Enaphalodes coronatus (White, 1853)
 Enaphalodes cortiphagus (Craighead, 1923)
 Enaphalodes hispicornis (Linnaeus, 1767)
 Enaphalodes niveitectus (Schaeffer, 1905)
 Enaphalodes rufulus (Haldeman, 1847)
 Enaphalodes seminitidus (Horn in Leng, 1885)
 Enaphalodes taeniatus (LeConte, 1854)

References

Elaphidiini